Macropodid alphaherpesvirus 1 (MaHV-1) is a species of herpesvirus in the genus Simplexvirus. It was officially accepted as a valid species by the International Committee on Taxonomy of Viruses in 2004.

Hosts 
It has been detected in captive parma wallabies (Macropus parma) while some other marsupial species have been found to be susceptible to infection when experimentally inoculated.

See also 
 Macropodid alphaherpesvirus 2

References

Further reading 

 
 
 
 

Alphaherpesvirinae